Georgia's 103rd House of representatives District elects one member of the Georgia House of Representatives. 
Its current representative is Republican Timothy Barr.

Elected representatives

References

Georgia House of Representatives districts
Gwinnett County, Georgia